Sydowia polyspora is a plant pathogen infecting Douglas firs. In Iceland, it has been reported to infect Larix russica, Pinus contorta and Pinus mugo. and on Rhododendron indicum.

References

External links
 Index Fungorum
 USDA ARS Fungal Database

Fungal conifer pathogens and diseases
Dothideales
Fungi described in 1953